Ammainaickanur is a panchayat town in Dindigul district  in the state of Tamil Nadu, India.

Demographics
 India census, Ammainaickanur had a population of 16,547. Males constitute 51% of the population and females 49%. Ammainaickanur has an average literacy rate of 65%, higher than the national average of 59.5%; with 57% of the males and 43% of females literate. 12% of the population is under 6 years of age. Kathali Narasinga Perumal temple is located in Ammainaickanur. Both Perumal and Shivan are in the same karuvarai which is not a very common thing to see.

References

Cities and towns in Dindigul district